Gordon Vernon Middlewick (14 August 1932 – 19 July 2021) was a South African cricketer who played first-class cricket for North-Eastern Transvaal from 1953 to 1961.

A fast-medium bowler, Gordon Middlewick made his first-class debut against the touring New Zealanders in 1953-54, opening the bowling and taking 6 for 83 and 4 for 74. In the first innings he twice took wickets with consecutive balls; in the second, when the New Zealanders were chasing runs quickly, he took wickets that at one stage looked likely to give North-Eastern Transvaal victory, though in the end New Zealand won by three wickets with four minutes to spare.

Middlewick's best figures were 6 for 22 when North-Eastern Transvaal dismissed Border for 58 in 1954–55. His most successful season was 1958–59, when he took 21 wickets at an average of 13.04 and formed a strong opening attack with Jackie Botten, who set a Currie Cup record with 55 wickets. However, such was North-Eastern Transvaal's weakness in other areas that they lost five of their six matches and finished last in the "B" section of the Currie Cup.

Middlewick was also a soccer player, good enough to travel to England in 1951 to try out for Manchester City. He became a referee.

Middlewick and his wife Monica moved from Transvaal to Margate in Natal in 1988.

References

External links

1932 births
2021 deaths
People from Benoni
South African cricketers
Northerns cricketers
Sportspeople from Gauteng
South African soccer players